Battle of Achelous or Battle of Acheloos can refer to:

 Battle of Achelous (917) on the Moesian Achelous river, between the Byzantines and Bulgarians.
 Battle of Achelous (1359), on the Aetolian Achelous river, between the Despotate of Epirus and Albanian chiefs